Gregory Hilko Wiltjer (born November 26, 1960) is a Canadian former professional basketball player. At a height of six feet, eleven inches (2.11 m) tall, he played at the centre position. He played in several important tournaments for the senior Canadian national basketball team, including the 1984 Summer Olympics. He won the FIBA European Cup Winners' Cup championship of the 1985–86 season, while playing with the Spanish club FC Barcelona, and 2 Greek League championships, while playing with Aris Thessaloniki, from 1987 to 1989.

High school
Wiltjer, who was born in Whitehorse, Yukon, and grew up on Vancouver Island, played hockey and soccer as a youth. He did not begin to play basketball formally, until he was a junior in high school.

College career
Wiltjer attended North Idaho College (JUCO), where in the 1979–80 and 1980–81 seasons, he posted very good numbers, and gained the attention of the University of Washington. Members of the university's coaching staff and booster club were found by the Pac-10 Conference to have violated player recruiting rules in his recruitment. Wiltjer then opted to join the fellow Pac-10 Conference school, Oregon State University.

Wiltjer's sole NCAA Division I college basketball season with the Oregon State Beavers, was memorable for the team's successful post-season run. Featuring A. C. Green, Lester Conner, and Charlie Sitton, the Ralph Miller coached Beavers reached the Elite Eight of the 1982 NCAA tournament, where as a No. 2 seed, they fell to the top-seeded Georgetown Hoyas, which were led by Patrick Ewing. Wiltjer sat out the next season, as he transferred to play for the then Canadian powerhouse, the University of Victoria. Wiltjer was a prominent member of a Vikes team, led by Eli Pasquale, and coached by Ken Shields, that won the CIAU championship in 1984, as part of their 5-year consecutive run as Canadian national champions.

Professional career 
Wiltjer was drafted in the second round of the 1984 NBA draft, by the Chicago Bulls, but he never played in an official game in the NBA, nor was he ever part of a regular season or playoff NBA roster, despite attending a number of preseason camps, for teams such as the Indiana Pacers in 1990, the Los Angeles Clippers in 1991, and the Cleveland Cavaliers in 1993.

Instead of playing in the NBA, Wiltjer plied his trade in Europe, with clubs in Italy, Spain, Greece, France, and Portugal, playing a total of 8 seasons in Europe. He was a member of the Spanish Liga ACB club, FC Barcelona, when the team won the European-wide 2nd-tier level FIBA European Cup Winners' Cup (later called FIBA Saporta Cup), during the 1985–86 season. He played for the Greek club Aris Thessaloniki, from 1987 to 1989, and with them, he won 2 Greek League championships (1988, 1989), and 2 Greek Cups (1988, 1989). With Aris, he also made it to 2 consecutive FIBA European Champion's Cup (now called EuroLeague) Final Fours, at Ghent (1988), and at Munich (1989).

Wiltjer won the Continental Basketball Association (CBA) championship, with the Omaha Racers in the 1992–93 season. In the 1993–94 season, he played in the Argentine League with Atlético Echagüe Paraná.

National team career 
Wiltjer was second in rebounding at the 1984 Summer Olympic Games, as Canada finished the tournament in fourth place. (The Michael Jordan led, Bobby Knight coached Team USA won the gold medal.) Wiltjer was also a member of the senior Canadian national team that was one of the first teams to face the original Dream Team in a competitive game, at the 1992 Tournament of the Americas. The Americans won the game easily, by a score of 105–61.

He also played with Canada at the 1982 FIBA World Championship, the 1986 FIBA World Championship, and the 1994 FIBA World Championship.

Personal life 
Wiltjer later coached junior high school basketball, for West Linn AAU in West Linn, Oregon, his adopted hometown – his wife Carol is an Oregon native. His son, Kyle Wiltjer, played two seasons of NCAA Division I college basketball at the University of Kentucky, serving as a key role-player in 2011–12, on their way to capturing the NCAA Division I Men's Basketball Championship, before transferring to Gonzaga, after the 2012–13 season. Before arriving at Kentucky, Kyle had led Jesuit High School to three consecutive Oregon state championships; he was also a 2011 McDonald's All-American, where he was the winner of the event's 3-point contest.

Wiltjer's daughter and Kyle's half-sister, Jordan Adams, played college basketball also at centre for New Mexico from 1999 to 2003. She was drafted by and played for the WNBA's Minnesota Lynx. Adams later played in Europe and for the Birmingham Power in the National Women's Basketball League (NWBL), where she was named an All-Star in 2005. She also represented Canada many times. In the 2010 FIBA World Championship for Women, Adams averaged 2.7 points and 1.7 rebounds per game.

Wiltjer was also a basketball coach in various European countries, from 2004 to 2006.

Sources 
 www.frozenhoops.com
 www.thedraftreview.com
 www.westlinntidings.com
 from The Washington Post
 www.oregonlive.com

References

External links
FIBA Profile

Spanish League Profile 
Italian League Profile 
Sports-Reference.com College Profile

1960 births
Living people
Aris B.C. players
Basketball people from Yukon
Basketball players at the 1984 Summer Olympics
Canadian expatriate basketball people in Greece
Canadian expatriate basketball people in Italy
Canadian expatriate basketball people in Spain
Canadian expatriate basketball people in the United States
Canadian men's basketball players
1982 FIBA World Championship players
Centers (basketball)
Chicago Bulls draft picks
FC Barcelona Bàsquet players
Junior college men's basketball players in the United States
Liga ACB players
Olympic basketball players of Canada
Omaha Racers players
Oregon State Beavers men's basketball players
People from West Linn, Oregon
Quad City Thunder players
Sportspeople from the Portland metropolitan area
Sportspeople from Whitehorse
Universiade bronze medalists for Canada
Universiade gold medalists for Canada
Universiade medalists in basketball
Victoria Vikes basketball players
Medalists at the 1983 Summer Universiade
Medalists at the 1985 Summer Universiade
1994 FIBA World Championship players